The Nearby Stars Database (NStars) began as a NASA project in 1998, then was based at Northern Arizona University.  It is now defunct.  The stated mission of NStars was "to be a complete and accurate source of scientific data about all stellar systems within 25 parsecs."  The website (see below) included search tools and links to an interactive forum.

Status

As of 1 January 2002, there were 2,633 stars in 2,029 systems in the database. As of 29 January 2008, the site is closed, displaying the message "This site is currently undergoing a major redesign and will be returned to service at a later date."

References

External links
 Nearby Stars Database on the Wayback Machine
 The Extrasolar Planets Encyclopaedia
 Near Star Catalogue (an unofficial update of the NSTARS database)
 Old Table from Wayback Machine Web Archive
 List as of 1 January 2009

Astronomical catalogues of stars
Databases in the United States